The A4 autostrada in Poland is a  long east–west motorway that runs through southern Poland, along the north side the Sudetes and Carpathian Mountains, from the Polish-German border at Zgorzelec-Görlitz (connecting to the A4 autobahn), through Wrocław, Opole, Gliwice, Katowice, Kraków, Tarnów and Rzeszów, to the Polish-Ukrainian border at Korczowa-Krakovets (connecting to the M10). It is a part of European route E40.

The motorway between Wrocław and Kraków was constructed between 1976 and 2005. Most of this part is tolled (see Tolls on Polish highways for details).

The section from the German border to Wrocław (not tolled) was constructed between 2002 and 2009, in large part as the repaving of the old concrete motorway constructed from 1933 to 1937 (then the territory of Nazi Germany). The repaved parts are substandard due to lack of emergency lanes and the speed limit is decreased to 110 km/h.

The motorway from Kraków to the Ukrainian border (not tolled) was constructed between 2010 and 2016, making the A4 the first Polish complete border-to-border highway connection.

History of construction
Some western stretches of this motorway were initially built as a Reichsautobahn by Nazi Germany in the 1930s under her interwar borders. After the Second World War and the takeover of Poland by the communist regime, with her new borders, the existing roads received minimal maintenance and upgrades and became notorious for their poor quality, a phenomenon similar to that observed in East Germany. In effect, the original road served in a virtually unchanged state throughout the whole communist period and the first years afterwards. Reconstruction between 2002 and 2006 removed the old concrete road surface (earlier, a short fragment of A18 was reconstructed between 1993 and 1995, of which 10 km (6.2 mi) are now part of A4), but some aspects of the 1930s standards of construction remain on the stretch from Krzyżowa to Wrocław; for example, the aforementioned section does not have emergency lanes, a feature that is to be added in the future.

The section between Katowice and Kraków was built from 1976 to 1996, and the section between Wrocław and Katowice from 1996 to 2005. Between 2006 and 2009, the section from the German border to the junction with A18 motorway was constructed, which completed continuous connection from Germany to Kraków.

Also completed in 2009 was the first portion of the motorway east of Kraków (20 km). The original plan was to finish the rest of the motorway by about 2013, but because of the UEFA decision to host the 2012 UEFA European Football Championship in Poland and Ukraine and the resulting need to improve the road infrastructure connecting the two countries, the date for opening the motorway to traffic was moved up to June 2012. This ambitious target was not attained after multiple delays, some caused by the floods of 2010. This meant the entire length of the A4 from the German border to the Ukrainian border was completed, making the A4 the first complete major motorway in Poland (second overall, behind the very short A8) and the first completed continuous border-to-border highway connection.

Sections of the motorway

Route description

See also
European route E40

References

External links

Official website of Katowice-Kraków section operator 

Motorways in Poland
European route E40